In 1942, the German U-boats attacked Bell Island two times which led to four ore boats sinking, and more than 60 men dead, making it one of the few places in the Dominion of Newfoundland raided during the Second World War. The Germans also tried to capture St. John's, the capital of Newfoundland. These engagements are considered part of the larger Battle of the St. Lawrence. Bell Island is in Conception Bay, Newfoundland and the waters were part of an important Atlantic convoy route that allowed supplies to flow from the United States to its allies in Europe. Many ships brought supplies in these waters to Britain's troops, but many of them were cut off by the German U-boats. Later in the war, many other ships sunk which led to the death of more than 137 people.

The German U-boat Attacks 

On the night of 4 September 1942 The German boat, U-513, which was under the command of Kapitänleutnant Rolf Ruggeberg, followed the iron ore carrier Evelyn B to Conception Bay. There, they spent the night under twenty metres of water. The next morning on 5 September the U-513 attacked and sank SS Lord Strathcona and SS Saganaga. A total of twenty-nine men who were all on Saganaga died. Right after the attack, U-513 left the fight following Evelyn B. On 2 November at 3 a.m., the waters off Bell Island saw a second attack, this time executed by U-518. Commanded by Kapitänleutnant Friedrich Wissmann, and she was at the southern end of Bell Island in an area known as “The Tickle,” also known as Wabana Anchorage. Over the course of an hour, she fired a torpedo at the 3,000 ton Anna T. It missed and went under SS Flydingdale which then exploded towards the loading dock. This explosion startled many in Bell Island. Wissman fired twice more. The torpedoes went straight towards SS Rose Castle, and the ship immediately sank, killing twenty-eight men with her. 
The Free French ship Paris Lyon Marseille 27 was also attacked, and right after she was hit,  sank losing twelve men. After these shootings, U-518 escaped even though there were two patrol boats nearby. This whole attack lasted ten minutes. Governor of Newfoundland Sir Humphrey Walwyn, was angered by these sinkings. Upon his return to St. John's, he called the Chief of Staff, Captain F.L. Houghton, and said “It was madness to let ships lie unprotected”. However, Houghton felt that it was better for the ships to be left alone in St. John's.

Aftermath

After all the attacks had happened, the result was indecisive.  Many Newfoundlanders wittnesed the aftermath of the raids. Evidence of the battle persist to today. Many pictures were taken of the ruins from the battle. Later on in 1942, On October 13, the ship SS Caribou, departed from Sydney at 9:30 p.m. The next morning, the boat U-69 under the command of Kapitänleutnant Ulrich Gräf, raided the vessel and it sank in the Gulf of St. Lawrence taking 137 people with it, including women and children.

References

the Bell islands
1942 in Newfoundland
the Bell islands
Naval battles of World War II involving Canada